Diopa is a genus of moths of the family Erebidae. The genus was erected by Francis Walker in 1858.

Species
Diopa corone Felder, 1874
Diopa creta Druce, 1901
Diopa furcula Walker, 1857
Diopa magnetica Schaus, 1911

References

Calpinae